is a peninsula located in Nagasaki Prefecture on the island of Kyushu, Japan. The peninsula incorporates the cities of Shimabara, Minamishimabara, and Unzen.

It was also the site of the Shimabara Rebellion, a 1637-1638 peasant and rōnin revolt, led by Christians. This further reinforced distrust of Christians and foreigners by Shōgun Iemitsu and contributed to the 1639 decision to isolate Japan from the outside world. From then on, the Dutch and the Chinese were the only ones permitted to enter Japan through Nagasaki in a very limited fashion until Japan was reopened again.

Administrative region

Eastern section of Isahaya
Shimabara
Minamishimabara
Unzen

References

Landforms of Nagasaki Prefecture
Peninsulas of Japan